Bromus maritimus is a species of brome grass known by the common names maritime brome and seaside brome. It is native to the coastal areas of California and Oregon.

References

External links
 Calflora Database: Bromus maritimus (Maritime brome)
Jepson eFlora: Bromus maritimus

maritimus
Bunchgrasses of North America
Native grasses of California
Grasses of the United States
Flora of Oregon
Natural history of the California chaparral and woodlands
Natural history of the Channel Islands of California
Natural history of the San Francisco Bay Area
Plants described in 1905
Flora without expected TNC conservation status